Anto Vasović (born June 15, 1995) is a Serbian footballer.

Club career
Born in Belgrade, Vasović made his professional debut for first team on 18 May 2013, in Jelen SuperLiga match versus Hajduk Kula. He began match on the bench and substituted in for Slavko Perović in 80th minute of match.

During the winter break of the 2014–15 season, he joined Serbian League Belgrade side FK Dorćol, after half season spent at same level side FK Brodarac 1947.

Personal life
Anto Vasović is the son of the Serbian water polo player Jugoslav Vasović. His uncle is a water polo player of the same name Anto Vasović.

References

External links
 Profile on FK Rad official website
 Profile at fudbalskitreningdif.com
 Stats at Utakmica.rs

1995 births
Living people
Footballers from Belgrade
Association football forwards
Serbian footballers
FK Rad players
FK Dorćol players
FK Bežanija players
Serbian SuperLiga players